Bhimavaram Town Railway Station (station code:BVRT) is an Indian Railways station in Bhimavaram of Andhra Pradesh. It is administered under Vijayawada railway division of South Coast Railway zone.

History 

GDV–BVRM Broad gauge railway opened by Jagjivan Ram Railway Minister on 8 October 1961. First express train passing through bvrt is narsapur express (17255/17256) interduceded in year 1-10-1979, first AC train was Cocanada SF Express (12775/12776) cct-sec and non-AC Superfast train was vskp-ltt SF Express (12749/12750) runs on Wednesday and Saturday at present it was converted into ordinary vskp-ltt (18519/18520) Express daily

Classification 
It falls under HG-2 railway station category.

Daily Connectivity 
Bhimavaram town station is very well connected to Major cities, with the below availability of trains

Time-Table

References 

Railway stations in West Godavari district
Bhimavaram